Internal may refer to:
Internality as a concept in behavioural economics
Neijia, internal styles of Chinese martial arts
Neigong or "internal skills", a type of exercise in meditation associated with Daoism
Internal (album) by Safia, 2016

See also

Internals (disambiguation)
External (disambiguation)